Harold S. Vincent High School is a public high school located on 7501 North Granville Road in Milwaukee, Wisconsin. The school is part of the Milwaukee Public Schools.  
Vincent's official student enrollment is 744 for the 2022-2023 school year. Vincent's student enrollment was 1,630 during the 2004–2005 school year. The school has several sports teams including football, basketball, and track & field.

Vincent High School was awarded a Blue Ribbon Presidential School of Excellence award in 1987 by The United States Department of Education.

It serves the community of Granville.

Demographics
Harold S. Vincent High School is:
89.5% African American
1.1% Caucasian/White
3.1% Asian/Pacific Islander
2.8% Hispanic
3% Two or More Races
0.5% American Indian/Alaska Native

Female 46%
Male 54%

Athletics
Vincent's traditional rivals are the Washington Purgolders.

The following sports are offered to students at Vincent:

Baseball
Basketball
Cheerleading
Cross Country
Football
Soccer
Softball
Tennis
Track & Field
Volleyball
Wrestling

State championships
Boys' track: 2001, 2003, 2005.
Boys' basketball:  1996, 1997, 1998, 2000, 2001.
Girls' basketball: 2007, 2008, 2009.

Notable alumni
 Adrian Battles, Class of 2006, NFL player
 Chuck Belin, Class of 1988, former NFL player
 Calvin Bellamy (Coo Coo Cal), Class of 1987, rap artist/songwriter
 Rodney Buford, Class of 1995, former NBA player
Deonte Burton, Class of 2013, former NBA player
 Diante Garrett, Class of 2007, former NBA player, plays in the Israeli Basketball Premier League
 Danny Gokey, Class of 1998, singer/songwriter
 Carl Landry, Class of 2002, former NBA player
 Marcus Landry, Class of 2005, former NBA
 DeAndre Levy, Class of 2005, former NFL player

References

External links
School website
Harold Vincent High School Alumni Association
Milwaukee Public Schools website

High schools in Milwaukee
Public high schools in Wisconsin